This is a list of foreign ministers of the Republic of China (based in Taiwan since 1949), heading its Ministry of Foreign Affairs.

Political Party:

Beiyang and Nationalist Governments

Post-1948 Constitution

See also
Foreign relations of the Republic of China
Ministry of Foreign Affairs (Republic of China)

References 

 List of Foreign ministers of ROC (with period, Chinese)

China